CKM may refer to:

Cabibbo–Kobayashi–Maskawa matrix in particle physics
CKM (magazine), a Polish men's magazine
C. K. McClatchy High School
Cotton Keays & Morris, an Australian pop music band
Creatine kinase, muscle, an enzyme
CKM (gene), a gene that in humans encodes the enzyme creatine kinase, muscle